Uskane (Uisceán in Irish) is a townland, a civil parish in the historical barony of Ormond Lower and an Electoral division in County Tipperary in Ireland.

Building of note
Uskane House, a four bay, three storey home with two chimneys at each end gable. It is listed as a protected structure by Tipperary County Council (RPS Ref S396). To the rear of the house is a small graveyard.

References

See also
 List of civil parishes of North Tipperary

Townlands of County Tipperary
Civil parishes of Ormond Lower